Reidar Bohlin Borgersen (born 10 April 1980) is a Norwegian former racing cyclist, and speed skater. He rode at the 2014 UCI Road World Championships, and was the 2012 and 2014 winner of the Norwegian National Time Trial Championships.

Major results

2010
 2nd Time trial, National Road Championships
2011
 2nd Time trial, National Road Championships
2012
 1st  Time trial, National Road Championships
 1st  Mountains classification Ronde de l'Oise
2013
 1st Ringerike GP
 3rd Time trial, National Road Championships
 4th Overall Boucles de la Mayenne
 7th Destination Thy
2014
 1st  Time trial, National Road Championships
 1st  Overall Okolo Jižních Čech
1st Stage 2 (ITT)
 1st Duo Normand (with Truls Korsæth)
 2nd Chrono Champenois
 3rd Overall Tour de Normandie
 3rd Chrono des Nations
 8th Overall Ronde de l'Oise
2015
 6th Chrono des Nations
 10th Gooikse Pijl
2016
 2nd Chrono Champenois
 3rd Overall Circuit des Ardennes
 4th Time trial, National Road Championships
 4th Grand Prix de la Ville de Lillers
 4th Ringerike GP
 6th Duo Normand (with Truls Korsæth)
 9th Chrono des Nations

References

External links

1980 births
Living people
Norwegian male cyclists
Place of birth missing (living people)
Norwegian male speed skaters
European Games competitors for Norway
Cyclists at the 2015 European Games
21st-century Norwegian people